Varacosa avara is a species of wolf spider (Lycosidae) found in the United States and Canada.

References

Lycosidae
Spiders of North America
Articles created by Qbugbot
Spiders described in 1877